Big Brother Australia 11, also known as Big Brother 2014, was the eleventh season of the Australian reality television series Big Brother. It began on 8 September 2014 on the Nine Network. The season ended on 26 November 2014, lasting 80 days. Excluding the celebrity edition of the show, this is the shortest Big Brother season to date. The show's renewal was confirmed by the Nine Network, who air the show, at the end of the previous season's finale. This was the third season of the show to air on the Nine Network after it picked up the series in 2012, following a four-year absence. The show was originally screened on Network Ten. Sonia Kruger continued as the host of the show, and Mike Goldman continued as the narrator.

Production

Auditions 
On 8 March 2014, details of open auditions for this season were revealed to be taking place in: Perth (3 April 2014), Brisbane (5 & 6 April 2014), Newcastle (10 April 2014), Sydney (12 & 13 April 2014), Albury (15 April 2014), Launceston (23 April 2014), Melbourne (26 & 27 April 2014), Adelaide (29 April 2014), Canberra (1 May 2014) and Townsville (7 May 2014). Applications were also accepted through sending an online video audition and were the only form of auditioning in the Northern Territory, where an applicant would film themselves and address why they thought they would be an ideal candidate for the show. However, these candidates would also be required to attend the open auditions but some may have been fast-tracked to a further stage of auditions if their video was deemed good enough by the show's producers. All applicants were required to be 18 years of age at least and have the necessary paperwork allowing them to stay in Australia until 1 January 2015. A new feature to the audition process was that people were invited to nominate 'a mate'. This involved someone putting another person forward who they thought would be an ideal candidate for the show. Those who were put forward by their 'mate' and were deemed good enough by producers were encouraged to attend further rounds of auditions or in some cases fast-tracked.

Development

Commercial 
On 13 August 2014, Big Brother Australia posted a photo with the caption "A Storm Is Coming" to their Facebook page. A day later the first commercial aired for the upcoming season featuring a Noah's Ark theme. On 24 August 2014, a second commercial aired stating that "One Housemate will have the ultimate power".

The House 
On 2 April 2014, it was rumoured that for the first time in the show's history, the house would have a second storey when the show's host, Sonia Kruger, announced that the house was "going up". It turned out that the diary room would form the upstairs portion of the house.

Overview

Twists
 Pair Housemates- Two strangers will compete in pairs. This twist was however put out of play on Day 16.
 Power Play - Each week housemate will be assigned as the Head/s of House and will be given a power play. A housemate is responsible for making decisions regarding on the task given to them. It is similar to United Kingdom's Big Brother UK: Power Trip's  Power Trip twist.
 Double Night, Double Eviction - Most weeks would feature 2 eviction episodes, the first would reveal the some of the safe housemates and the first evictee of the week and the second would reveal the second evictee among those that were not safe at the conclusion of the first eviction.
 Mass Eviction - More than 2 housemates got evicted within the week.

The House 
The purpose built house is located at Dreamworld on the Gold Coast Australia. There are two storeys to the House for the first time in the franchise. Housemates enter through a set of gates into the backyard area, which has been described as 'old school Miami cool' with a hint of Hollywood glamour, due to the big pool, flamingo statues, sun loungers, gym area and the skin-coloured textures that are used. Within the pool there is a plastic oversized tube, known as the fishbowl, where Housemates may be sent if they are punished by Big Brother. Also located in the backyard is a treehouse – where Housemates can gossip – for the very first time. The kitchen overlooks the backyard; it has a tropical colouring, with an infusion of yellow and green colours. It includes a surface for preparing food, dining table, and a bar. There is a state-of-the-art shower in the spacious white and blue coloured bathroom, with 'edgy' artwork used as décor. There are two bedrooms, the blue bedroom and the pink bedroom, where Housemates must share a bed with their paired partner. The Diary Room chair is the only room to be located on the second storey. It has wings around it, with the whole room signalling an angelic theme. This season Housemates are playing in pairs and can win the role of Heads of House. During their time as Heads of House, pairs are invited to sleep in the Sanctuary, a private place that includes a bedroom, pool and a hot tub. The Heads of House make important decisions in the Power Room, where any conversations they have must be kept private unless told otherwise by the all-seeing ruler, Big Brother.

On June 22 2019, Six children were arrested after they burnt down the house itself. The children were found at Coomera railway station shortly after the arson. Two of the children were charged with vandalism. The house was completely destroyed and it was demolished along with the Dreamworld Studios shortly after. Australian YouTuber Muitube filmed the whole house which was a month before the house was burnt down.

Housemates 
, sixteen Housemates had entered the House. It was revealed that the Housemates would be entering and playing as pairs. Big Brother determined that each pair was either a good or bad match, based on psychological evaluations.

On Day 24, first intruder Leo entered the house, followed by Marina on Day 35, and Lina, Penny, Richard and Tom on Day 49.

Pairs 

On launch night it was announced that the housemates would be playing in pairs. Below is a list of the paired housemates. However, this twist was announced to be over on Day 16 after the first eviction.

 The pairs were separated following a swap executed by the Heads of House, Dion and Jason, on Day 8.

Head of House 
The Head of House is responsible for making important decisions in the House (known as Power Plays). As the Housemates are playing in pairs, there will be two Heads of House at a time.

On Day 0, pre-selected Head of House Priya had to choose whom to pair up with (either Katie or Jake) making them also a 'HoH'. She choose Katie and the pair were given their first Power Play. They had to select one pair of Housemates to be isolated from the House for the first night. They chose Dion & Jason, who were then banished to the fish bowl in the garden. Katie & Priya were then offered a sum of money from the prize fund, however food would be taken from the House. The more money they took, the longer the Housemates would live without food. They decided to take $10,000 in exchange for no food for a week. The amount of money they took was later revealed to the other Housemates – by way of Katie & Priya having to have the $10,000 with them at all times – but, what was not revealed (until Day 4) was that this money was taken from the total prize fund. On Day 6, Katie & Priya made their last Power Play as the Heads of House. They were able to barter with Big Brother, and, for $1,500 each, were able to grant themselves immunity from the first eviction.
On Day 6, it was revealed that the Australian public had chosen Dion & Jason to be the next Heads of House. On Day 8, Dion and Jason made their first Power Play as the Heads of House. They had to swap a member of one pair with a member from another, thereby creating two new pairs. They chose to switch Cat and Sam and Travis and Ryan. This meant that the new pairs formed were Cat and Travis, and Sam and Ryan. On Day 10, Dion & Jason received the Nominations Power Play. This resulted in them having double the usual number of nomination points to spread across any number of Housemates in the first round of nominations.
On Day 12, Big Brother 10 winner Tim Dormer re-entered the Big Brother House. He was asked to select the first solo Head of House and was assigned a series of tasks during his stay, which included telling the Housemates they will no longer be playing as pairs after the first eviction. Tim ended up choosing Lawson on Day 13. On Day 16, Lawson received the Nominations Power Play. This resulted in him having 12 nomination points, which could be used to both view other housemates positions on the Nominations Table, as well as nominate. As his second Power Play, Lawson got to choose two housemates that would think they were taking part in an online web chat with fans of the show, when in actuality, the questions from the fans were coming from Lawson and Sam. Lawson chose David and Jason.
 On Day 20, it was revealed that the Australian public had chosen Sam as the new Head of House. Sam was given the opportunity to prank a fellow housemate, along with a housemate of his choice (Sandra). They were asked to pick a housemate that would possibly promote a fake product. They chose Travis to do this. Sam also received the Nominations Power Play, resulting in him having 12 nomination points, which could be used to both view other housemates positions on the Nominations Table, as well as nominate.
 On Day 27, it was revealed that the Australian public had chosen Cat as the new Head of House. As part of the hotel task, where housemates are split into hotel guests and staff that cater to the guests' every need, Cat was asked to divide the housemates into the two categories as her first Power Play. As Head of House, Cat was already a guest, and chose the other six nominated housemates at the time; Aisha, David, Jake, Lisa, Skye and Travis to join her, leaving Jason, Lawson, Leo, Priya, Ryan, Sam and Sandra to be the hotel staff. On Day 30, Cat received the Nominations Power Play, resulting in her having 12 nomination points, which could be used to both view other housemates positions on the Nominations Table, as well as nominate. On Day 31, Cat was offered the chance to view every housemate's nominations from the previous night, in exchange for letting the other housemates view her and Lawson's night in the sanctuary earlier in the week. Cat chose not to view the nominations in exchange for the night in the sanctuary remaining secret.
 On Day 35, it was revealed that the Australian public had chosen Skye as the new Head of House. On Day 37, Skye received the Nominations Power Play, resulting in her having 12 nomination points, which could be used to both view other housemates positions on the Nominations Table, as well as nominate. On Day 38, Skye was offered the chance to win $5,000 by digging through a treasure chest to find 5 gold coins (worth $1,000 each) within 60 seconds, in exchange for her nominations being shown to the rest of the housemates. Skye accepted this task and won the $5,000.
 On Day 41, it was revealed that the Australian public had chosen Priya as the new Head of House. As Priya's first Power Play, she was asked who she thought was coasting in the game. Priya thought Aisha was, and as a result, Aisha was offered $20,000 to evict herself from the house. Aisha declined. However a counteroffer was made. Aisha and Travis were offered $50,000 to split between them if they evicted themselves together. Aisha and Travis declined. On Day 45, Priya received the Nominations Power Play, resulting in her having 12 nomination points, which could be used to both view other housemates positions on the Nominations Table, as well as nominate.
 On Day 49, it was revealed that the Australian public had chosen Ryan as the new Head of House. On Day 51, Ryan was informed that the four new intruders, Lina, Penny, Richard and Tom, were moving from the Sanctuary into the Big Brother House. Ryan was tasked with choosing four original housemates to live in the Sanctuary in their place, indefinitely. Ryan chose Cat, Leo, Priya and Travis.
 On Day 55, it was revealed that the Australian public had chosen David as the new Head of House. As soon as David was appointed, he was asked to choose a housemate living in the Sanctuary to join the housemates for a party. Cat, Leo, Priya and Travis had the opportunity to plea to David to let them attend. David chose Cat to attend the party. On Day 60, David received the  Nominations Power Play, resulting in him having 12 nomination points, which could be used to both view other housemates positions on the Nominations Table, as well as nominate.
 On Day 61, the housemates voted in a secret ballot to select the new Head of House. There was a tie between Richard and Travis. The deciding vote was cast by the existing Head of House, David. He picked Travis as the new Head of House. On Day 65, Travis was given a Power Play with several choices. He could eat a whole lasagne cooked by his mother, a smaller portion of lasagne and get the chance to ask Aisha a question, or eat an extremely small portion of lasagne and ask Aisha two questions. Travis chose the final option. His two questions were whether Aisha will move to Melbourne to be with him (she said yes) and which three housemates were most popular based on Sportsbet (Travis, Skye and Ryan). Travis also received the Nominations Power Play, resulting in him being able to nominate for himself, as well as having a loved one nominate on his behalf.
 On Day 69, Travis' week as the Head of House came to end. Entering the final week of the game, no further Heads of House were selected.

 Colour key
 Won the title of Head of House
 Eligible to become Head of House
 Not in the House at the time when the Head of House was decided
 Was not eligible to become Head of House

Weekly Summary 

Big Brother 2014 

Prize Money

Cat & Lawson      50,000

Nominations Table

Nominations Power Play 
The Nominations Power Play is a weekly twist to nominations. It is a special secret power given to the Heads of House. The Nominations Power Play gives an advantage to the Heads of House for nominations in that given week.

 In Week 2's nominations, whilst the other pairs had to distribute five points between their nominations, Heads of House Dion & Jason had ten.
 From Week 3 to Week 7 and Week 9, the Head of House during each week had 12 nomination points, which could be used to both view other housemates positions on the Nominations Table, as well as nominate.
 In Week 10's nominations, whilst all the other housemates had a loved one nominate on their behalf, Head of House Travis was able to nominate for himself, as well as having a loved one nominate on his behalf.

Note:  The Head(s) of House holding the Nominations Power Play each week it was in play is marked in green.

Notes 

: On Day 6, Katie & Priya made their last Power Play as the Heads of House. They were able to barter with Big Brother, and, for $1,500 each, were able to grant themselves immunity from the first round of nominations. As housemates were playing in pairs during this week, they had to nominate in the Diary Room in their pairs another pair to face eviction. On Day 16, Gemma & Jake received the fewest votes to save and were subject to a house vote to determine who of the two would be evicted. Housemates, by order of random draw, voted to save either Gemma or Jake from eviction. The first Housemate with eight votes to save would be safe, with the other being evicted. Because Jake received eight votes before all of the votes were cast; David, Lawson, Ryan, Skye and Travis did not have to cast votes.
: Week 3 was a double eviction week, with a surprise eviction occurring on Day 22, where Dion was evicted and Cat was saved. The regular scheduled eviction took place on Day 23.
: Week 4 was a double eviction week, with an eviction occurring on both Day 29, where Jake was evicted and Skye was saved, and on Day 30.
: Leo was exempt from nominations this week, being an intruder. Week 5 was a fake double eviction week, with the first one being fake, and the second being real. Travis received the highest number of votes to save and was fake evicted.
: Assuming Travis had been evicted, the housemates could not nominate him, however Travis could still secretly nominate from the Sanctuary. Marina was exempt from nominations this week, being an intruder. After telling Lawson who she did not nominate, Cat was penalized, and given one nomination point by Big Brother. Week 6 was a double eviction week, with an eviction occurring on both Day 44, where Sandra was evicted and Ryan was saved, and on Day 45.
: There were no nominations in Week 8. Instead, all housemates were automatically nominated for eviction. Lina, Penny, Richard and Tom were exempt from nominations this week, being intruders. Week 8 was a triple eviction week, with a singular eviction occurring on Day 57, where Lawson was evicted and David, Priya, Ryan and Skye were saved, and a double eviction occurring on Day 58, where Aisha and Cat were evicted.
: Week 9 was a double eviction week, with an eviction occurring on Day 65, where Tom was evicted, and on Day 66, where Richard was evicted.
: On Day 66, after convincing Travis to give them information about his power play, Priya and Skye were penalized, and were automatically given three nomination points by Big Brother. Travis was not penalized. This week, each housemate had a loved one enter the house and nominate on their behalf. Week 10 was a double eviction week, with an eviction occurring on Day 71, where Leo was evicted, and on Day 72.
: For the Final Week, the Australian public began voting for the winner of Big Brother Australia 2014  and the $200,000 grand prize between the Final 6 Housemates. The voting lines froze on Day 79 and the three housemates with the lowest vote totals were evicted, leaving three housemates in the house for the finale.

Ratings 
Ratings are rounded to the nearest ten thousand. Figures in Bold indicate timeshifted viewing figures.

 Combined ratings; the show aired on both Channel Nine & GO! at different times in different states.

Criticism

Axing of Live Updates 
The current season has received criticism for not offering live updates via Twitter and on the official website – with news stories on the site not being posted until after the event has aired, which can be up to 24 hours after the event in question has actually occurred. This lack of live information follows Nine's decision not to offer live camera feeds online after it rebooted the series, believing it did not meet in with their family-friendly rebranded series.

Gemma's Eviction 
The format of the first eviction which saw housemate Gemma evicted, has been considered controversial by many media sources and fans alike. It was seen almost as a form of bullying as the housemates choose in a schoolyard pick style for who stays and goes. Gemma lost to Jake as she only got one person behind her (Priya) and Jake had everyone else

References

External links 
 

2014 Australian television seasons
11